Ama Lou (born May 9, 1998) is an English singer-songwriter. Born and raised in London, United Kingdom. She is classically trained as a singer and began writing music at the age of 11.

Early life
Ama Lou was born in London, England.

Career
Lou supported Jorja Smith during her 2018 tour. Lou received media attention after Drake captioned an Instagram post with lyrics from her song "TBC". Drake also stated that Lou was one of the main influences for his album Scorpion.

Lou signed to Interscope Records in late 2019.

Influences
Lou grew up listening to Gil Scott-Heron, Billie Holiday and Ella Fitzgerald inspired in part by her father's love of Soul, R&B and Jazz.

Discography
 DDD (EP) (2018)
 Ama, who? (EP) (2019)
 At Least We Have This (EP) (2021)

References 

Living people
21st-century Black British women singers
Musicians from London
1998 births